The Pyrénées-Orientales department is composed of 226 communes. It covers about 78 per cent of its land area of the department.

Most of the territory (except for the district of Fenolheda) formed part of the Principality of Catalonia until 1659, and Catalan is still spoken (in addition to French) by a significant minority of the population. The Catalan names of communes are taken from the Enciclopèdia catalana and are intended for comparison with the official French names: they do not indicate the current or former linguistic status of the commune.

List of intercommunalities 

The communes cooperate in the following intercommunalities (as of 2020):
Communauté urbaine Perpignan Méditerranée Métropole
Communauté de communes Agly Fenouillèdes
Communauté de communes des Albères, de la Côte Vermeille et de l'Illibéris
Communauté de communes des Aspres
Communauté de communes Conflent-Canigó
Communauté de communes Corbières Salanque Méditerranée (partly)
Communauté de communes du Haut Vallespir
Communauté de communes Pyrénées Catalanes
Communauté de communes Pyrénées Cerdagne
Communauté de communes Roussillon-Conflent
Communauté de communes Sud-Roussillon
Communauté de communes du Vallespir

List of communes

Former communes and names 
The following names of communes are no longer in use, 
either because the commune has been absorbed into another 
commune or because it has changed name.

 Amélie-les-Bains → Amélie-les-Bains-Palalda (1942)
 Angoustrine → Angoustrine-Villeneuve-des-Escaldes (1973)
 Anills → Ponteilla (< 1800)
 Argelès → Argelès-sur-Mer (1840)
 Arles-les-Bains → Amélie-les-Bains (1840) → Amélie-les-Bains-Palalda (1942)
 Ayguatébia → Ayguatébia-Talau (1983)
 Aytua → Escaro (1822)
 Bajande → Estavar (1822)
 Belloc → Villefranche (< 1800) → Villefranche-de-Conflent (1893)
 Belpuig → Prunet-et-Belpuig (< 1800)
 Bessegarde → L'Écluse (< 1800) → Les Cluses (1984)
 Boiça → Alénya (< 1800)
 Cabanes → Saint-Génis (< 1800) → Saint-Génis-des-Fontaines (1968)
 Caldegas → Bourg-Madame (1973)
 Canet → Canet-en-Roussillon-Saint-Nazaire (1972) → Canet-en-Roussillon (1983)
 Canet-en-Roussillon-Saint-Nazaire → Canet-en-Roussillon and Saint-Nazaire (1983)
 Caudiès → Caudiès-de-Conflent (1983)
 Caudiès → Caudiès-de-Fenouillèdes (1898)
 Château-Roussillon → Perpignan (< 1800)
 Comes → Eus (1828)
 Corneilla → Corneilla-de-Conflent (1933)
 Cortals → La Llagonne (1822)
 L'Écluse → Les Cluses (1984)
 En → Nyer (1822)
 Espira → Espira-de-Conflent (1933)
 Évol → Olette (1827)
 Fetges → Sauto (< 1800)
 Flassa → Jujols (< 1800)
 Fontanils → Arles-sur-Tech (1823)
 Garrieux → Salses (< 1800)
 Garrius → Salses (< 1800)
 Hix → Bourg-Madame (1815)
 Les Horts → Serdinya (1822)
 Las Illas → Maureillas-las-Illas (1972)
 Ille → Ille-sur-Têt (1953)
 Laroque → Laroque-des-Albères (1953)
 Lavaill → Sorède (1822)
 Levilar → Villelongue-dels-Monts (1803)
 Llar → Canaveilles (1821)
 Marcevol → Arboussols (1822)
 Marians → Souanyas (1822)
 Maureillas → Maureillas-las-Illas (1972)
 Molitg → Molitg-les-Bains (1970)
 Montalba → Montalba-d'Amélie (1933) → Amélie-les-Bains-Palalda (1963)
 Montalba → Montalba-le-Château (1933)
 Montalba-d'Amélie → Amélie-les-Bains-Palalda (1963)
 Montesquieu → Montesquieu-des-Albères (1992)
 Nidolère → Tresserre (< 1800)
 Nyls → Ponteilla (< 1800)
 Odeillo → Odeillo-Via (1900) → Font-Romeu-Odeillo-Via (1957)
 Odeillo-Via → Font-Romeu-Odeillo-Via (1957)
 Opoul → Opoul-Périllos (1972)
 Palalda → Amélie-les-Bains-Palalda (1942)
 Palau → Palau-de-Cerdagne (1936)
 Palol → Céret (1823)
 Passa-Llauro-Tordères → Llauro, Passa and Tordères (1989)
 La Pave → Argelès (< 1800) → Argelès-sur-Mer (1840)
 La Perche → La Cabanasse (< 1800)
 Perillos → Opoul-Périllos (1972)
 Pézilla → Pézilla-de-Conflent (1933)
 Porté → Porté-Puymorens (1954)
 Prats → Prats-de-Sournia (1933)
 Prats → Prats-Saint-Thomas (< 1800) → Fontpédrouse (1822)
 Prats-de-Mollo → Prats-de-Mollo-la-Preste (1956)
 Prats-Saint-Thomas → Fontpédrouse (1822)
 Prunet → Prunet-et-Belpuig (< 1800)
 Ria → Ria-Sirach-Urbanya (1973)
 Ria-Sirach-Urbanya → Ria-Sirach and Urbanya (1983)
 Riunogues → Maureillas-las-Illas (1972)
 Ro → Saillagouse (1822)
 Rohet → Llo (< 1800)
 Sahorle → Vinça (< 1800)
 Saillagouse-Llo → Llo and Saillagouse (1984)
 Saint-Génis → Saint-Génis-des-Fontaines (1968)
 Saint-Martin → Maureillas (1823) → Maureillas-las-Illas (1972)
 Saint-Paul → Saint-Paul-de-Fenouillet (1953)
 Saint-Thomas → Prats-Saint-Thomas (< 1800) → Fontpédrouse (1822)
 Salses → Salses-le-Château (1986)
 Selva → Las Illas (1823) → Maureillas-las-Illas (1972)
 Serrabonne → Boule-d'Amont (1822)
 Sirach → Ria (1822) → Ria-Sirach-Urbanya (1973) → Ria-Sirach (1983)
 Talau → Ayguatébia-Talau (1983)
 Taxo-d'Amont → Saint-André (< 1800)
 Taxo-d'Avall → Argelès (< 1800) → Argelès-sur-Mer (1840)
 Thuès-Dellar → Thuès-Entre-Valls (1822)
 Touren → Sahorre (1822)
 Vedrinyans → Saillagouse (1822)
 Vernet → Vernet-les-Bains (1953)
 Via → Odeillo (1822)→ Odeillo-Via (1900) → Font-Romeu-Odeillo-Via (1957)
 Villefranche → Villefranche-de-Conflent (1893)
 Villeneuve-des-Escaldes → Angoustrine-Villeneuve-des-Escaldes (1973)
 Villerach → Clara (1822)
 Villeroge → Coustouges (< 1800)

References

Pyrenees-Orientales